Jacques de Bourbon, Count de Busset (27 April 1912, Paris – 7 May 2001, Paris) was a French novelist, essayist and politician. He was elected to the Académie française on 4 June 1981. He was a senior member of the House of Bourbon-Busset.

Bibliography
1946  Le Sel de la terre (under the pseudonym Vincent Laborde)  (Gallimard)
1956  Antoine, mon frère  (Gallimard)
1957  Le Silence et la Joie (Grand Prix du roman de l'Académie française)  (Gallimard)
1957  L’Encyclopédie française, tome XI : La vie internationale (in collaboration)
1958  Le remords est un luxe  (Gallimard)
1959  Mazarin, en collaboration  (Hachette)
1959  Fugue à deux voix  (Gallimard)
1959  Moi, César  (Gallimard)
1960  L’Olympien  (Gallimard)
1960  Mémoires d’un lion  (Gallimard)
1961  César, en collaboration  (Hachette)
1962  Les Aveux infidèles  (Gallimard)
1962  Alexandre, in collaboration  (Hachette)
1963  La Grande Conférence  (Gallimard)
1964  Paul Valéry ou le mystique sans Dieu  (Plon)
1964  Le Protecteur  (Gallimard)
1965  La Nuit de Salernes  (Gallimard)
1966  La nature est un talisman (Journal I)  (Gallimard)
1967  Les Arbres et les Jours (Journal II)  (Gallimard)
1969  L’Amour durable (Journal III)  (Gallimard)
1969  Homme et Femme il les créa  (Fayard)
1971  Comme le diamant (Journal IV)  (Gallimard)
1972  Le Jeu de la constance  (Gallimard)
1973  Le lion bat la campagne  (Gallimard)
1974  Le Couple en question, dialogue avec Marc Oraison  (Beauchesne)
1974  Complices (Journal V)  (Gallimard)
1975  Laurence de Saintonge  (Gallimard)
1976  Au vent de la mémoire (Journal VI), (grand prix catholique de littérature)  (Gallimard)
1978  Je n’ai peur de rien quand je suis sûr de toi  (Gallimard)
1978  Tu ne mourras pas (Journal VII)  (Gallimard)
1979  La Différence créatrice  (Le Cerf)
1980  Les Choses simples (Journal VIII), (prix Marcel Proust)  (Gallimard)
1982  La Force des jours (Journal IX)  (Gallimard)
1983  Le Berger des nuages  (Gallimard)
1984  L’Empire de la passion  (PUF)
1985  Bien plus qu’aux premiers jours (Journal X)  (Gallimard)
1987  Lettre à Laurence  (Gallimard)
1987  Confession de Don Juan  (Albin Michel)
1989  Laurence ou la sagesse de l’amour fou  (Gallimard)
1990  L’Audace d’aimer  (Gallimard)
1991  L’Instant perpétuel  (Gallimard)
1992  Foi jurée, esprit libre  (Desclée de Brouwer)
1993  L’Esprit de la forêt  (Gallimard)
1995  L’Amour confiance  (Gallimard)
1996  La Tendresse inventive  (Gallimard)
1997  Alliance  (Gallimard)
1999  Les ailes de l'esprit  (Le Rocher)
2000  La raison ardente  (Gallimard)
2002  L'absolu vécu à deux  (Gallimard)

External links
  L'Académie française

1912 births
2001 deaths
Writers from Paris
Jacques De Bourbon-Busset
Members of the Académie Française
École Normale Supérieure alumni
Grand Prix du roman de l'Académie française winners
Lycée Henri-IV alumni
French male writers